Clayton Shields Perry (December 18, 1881 – January 13, 1954) was an American baseball player who played principally as a second baseman and third baseman. He played professional baseball for 14 years from 1905 to 1918, including seven games in Major League Baseball with the Detroit Tigers in 1908.

Early years
Perry was born in 1881 in Rice Lake, Wisconsin. He attended the University of Wisconsin.  He was a member of Wisconsin's Class of 1907 and played baseball for the Wisconsin Badgers baseball team.

Professional baseball player
Perry appeared in seven games for the Detroit Tigers in 1908. He played third base and had two hits in 17 at bats for a .118 batting average. He was acquired by Detroit to fill in during an injury to the team's regular third baseman Bill Coughlin.

Perry also played minor league baseball from 1905 to 1918, including stints with the Oskaloosa Quakers (1905), Montgomery Senators (1906–1908), Little Rock Travelers (1909), Chattanooga Lookouts (1910–1911), Nashville Volunteers (1911-1913), Mobile Gulls (1914–1915), Beaumont Oilers (1916–1917), and San Antonio Bronchos (1917–1918).

Later years
Perry was married to Hilda Bjoin Perry.  He died in 1954 at Rice Lake, Wisconsin.  He was buried at Nora Cemetery in that city.

References

External links

1881 births
1954 deaths
Detroit Tigers players
Baseball players from Wisconsin
Wisconsin Badgers baseball players
Minor league baseball managers
Oskaloosa Quakers players
Montgomery Senators players
Little Rock Travelers players
Chattanooga Lookouts players
Nashville Vols players
Mobile Sea Gulls players
Beaumont Oilers players
San Antonio Bronchos players
People from Rice Lake, Wisconsin